Frederik Daniël Jacobus "Fritz" Brand SC (born 16 February 1949) is a former judge of the Supreme Court of Appeal of South Africa.

Early life and education 
Brand was born in Paarl and matriculated at the High School Vredenburg in 1966. After school he enrolled at Stellenbosch University and obtained a BA degree in 1970, an LL.B. degree in 1972 and an LL.M. (cum laude) in 1976.

Career 
Brand started his career in 1973 as a Senior lecturer at Stellenbosch University and was admitted as advocate in May 1973. He lectured until 1976 and on 10 May 1977 joined the Cape Bar. Brand was granted senior status in November 1989 and in September 1992 he was appointed Judge of the Cape High Court.

He was appointed to the bench of the Supreme Court of Appeal with effect from 1 December 2001. In 2010 he was appointed as an acting judge to the Constitutional Court, for two terms.

References

1949 births
Living people
South African judges